The Aussie Peppers are a professional softball team based in North Mankato, Minnesota. They were founded in 2018 as the Aussie Spirit as part of the National Pro Fastpitch league. The Aussie Peppers are partnered with the Australia women's national softball team and play their games at the Caswell Park Softball Complex.

Current players

References

External links
Official Site

Softball teams in the United States
Sports teams in Minnesota
National Pro Fastpitch teams
2018 establishments in Minnesota
Sports clubs established in 2018
Softball in Australia
Mankato, Minnesota